The  Rochester Raiders season was the team's fifth season as a football franchise and second in the Indoor Football League (IFL). One of twenty-five teams competing in the IFL for the 2010 season, the Raiders were members of the Atlantic East Division of the United Conference. The team played their home games at The Dome Arena in Henrietta, New York.

Schedule

Regular season

Standings

Playoffs

Roster

References

Rochester Raiders seasons
Rochester Raiders
Sports in Rochester, New York
Rochester Raiders